Bahuarwa Bhatha is a village development committee in Parsa District in the Narayani Zone of southern Nepal. At the time of the 2011 Nepal census it had a population of 6,984 people living in 1,012 individual households. There were 3,634 males and 3,350 females at the time of census.

References

Populated places in Parsa District